The UK Albums Chart is one of many music charts compiled by the Official Charts Company that calculates the best-selling albums of the week in the United Kingdom. Since 2004 the chart has been based on the sales of both physical albums and digital downloads. This list shows albums that peaked in the Top 10 of the UK Albums Chart during 2013, as well as albums which peaked in 2012 and 2014 but were in the top 10 in 2013. The entry date is when the album appeared in the top 10 for the first time (week ending, as published by the Official Charts Company, which is six days after the chart is announced).

One-hundred and seventy-two albums were in the top ten this year. One album from 2011 and seventeen albums from 2012 remained in the top 10 for several weeks at the beginning of the year, while Beyoncé by Beyoncé was released in 2013 but did not reach its peak until 2014. Halcyon by Ellie Goulding debuted in 2012 and re-entered the top 10 in 2013, but its peak position was not until 2014. Six artists scored multiple entries in the top 10 in 2013. The 1975, Bastille, Frank Turner, James Arthur and Kodaline were among the many artists who achieved their first UK charting top 10 album in 2013.

18 Months by Calvin Harris returned to the top spot in the first week of 2013. The first new number-one album of the year was Les Misérables: Highlights from the Motion Picture Soundtrack by the Les Misérables cast.  Overall, thirty-five different albums peaked at number-one in 2013, with thirty-five unique artists hitting that position.

Background

Multiple entries
One-hundred and seventy-two albums charted in the top 10 in 2013, with one-hundred and fifty-two albums reaching their peak this year (including The Complete Greatest Hits which charted in previous years but reached a peak on its latest chart run).

Six artists scored multiple entries in the top 10 in 2013. Andrea Bocelli, Jake Bugg, Justin Timberlake, Michael Bublé, One Direction and Robbie Williams were the acts who had two top 10 albums this year. Andrea Bocelli and Justin Timberlake's two entries were both released this year, with Christmas by Michael Bublé returning after making the top ten before.

Chart debuts
Forty-six artists achieved their first top 10 album in 2013 as a lead artist. 

The following table (collapsed on desktop site) does not include acts who had previously charted as part of a group and secured their first top 10 solo album, or featured appearances on compilations or other artists recordings. 

Notes
Johnny Marr had great success as a member of The Smiths, including four albums which reached the top two. He scored a top 10 hit with his debut solo album The Messenger in 2013. After three previous attempts, will.i.am achieved a first top 10 peaking album outside The Black Eyed Peas, as #willpower landed at number 3.

Agnetha Fältskog secured the first top 10 album of her solo career, A which placed at number six. She was best known for her hits with the four-piece ABBA. Shane Filan moved on from Westlife and made the top 10 with You and Me, a number 6 hit.

Soundtracks
The soundtrack album for the film Les Misérables was the only soundtrack recording to reach the top ten in 2013, spending four weeks at number-one in total.

Best-selling albums
One Direction had the best-selling album of the year with Midnight Memories. The album spent six weeks in the top 10 (including two weeks at number one), sold over million copies and was certified by the BPI. Our Version of Events by Emeli Sandé came in second place. Michael Bublé's To Be Loved, Swings Both Ways from Robbie Williams and Right Place Right Time by Olly Murs made up the top five. Albums by Bruno Mars, Rod Stewart, Arctic Monkeys, Gary Barlow and Ellie Goulding were also in the top ten best-selling albums of the year.

Top-ten albums
Key

Entries by artist
The following table shows artists who achieved two or more top 10 entries in 2013, including albums that reached their peak in 2012. The figures only include main artists, with featured artists and appearances on compilation albums not counted individually for each artist. The total number of weeks an artist spent in the top ten in 2013 is also shown.

Notes

 18 Months re-entered the top 10 at number 7 on 5 January 2013 (week ending) for 7 weeks, at number 8 on 4 May 2013 (week ending) for 2 weeks, at number 8 on 27 July 2013 (week ending) and at number 8 on 24 August 2013 (week ending) for 2 weeks.
 Ora re-entered the top 10 at number 8 on 5 January 2013 (week ending) for 2 weeks.
 Our Version of Events re-entered the top 10 at number 10 on 8 June 2013 (week ending).
 Right Place Right Time re-entered the top 10 at number 7 on 16 March 2013 (week ending), at number 9 on 15 June 2013 (week ending), at number 8 on 29 June 2013 (week ending) for 3 weeks and at number 4 on 7 December 2013 (week ending) for 5 weeks.
 Unapologetic re-entered the top 10 at number 10 on 13 April 2013 (week ending).
 Christmas (Michael Buble) originally peaked at number-one upon its initial release in 2011. It returned to the top 10 at the end of 2012 around Christmas. It re-entered the top 10 at number 10 on 14 December 2013 (week ending) for 4 weeks.
 Unorthodox Jukebox re-entered the top 10 at number 7 on 23 February 2013 (week ending) for 12 weeks, at number 7 on 8 June 2013 (week ending) and at number 9 on 6 July 2013 (week ending) for 4 weeks.
 Take Me Home re-entered the top 10 at number 8 on 2 February 2013 (week ending).
 Nothing but the Beat originally peaked at number 2 on its initial release in 2011. 
 + re-entered the top 10 at number 3 on 12 January 2013 (week ending) for 4 weeks.
 Jake Bugg re-entered the top 10 at number 4 on 13 January 2013 (week ending) for 9 weeks and at number 5 on 6 July 2013 (week ending) for 5 weeks.
 Les Misérables: Highlights from the Motion Picture Soundtrack re-entered the top 10 at number 10 on 25 May 2013 (week ending).
 The Lumineers re-entered the top 10 at number 8 on 6 April 2013 (week ending).
 Fall to Grace re-entered the top 10 at number 9 on 26 January 2013 (week ending) and at number 10 on 2 March 2013 (week ending).
 Some Nights re-entered the top 10 at number 10 on 12 January 2013 (week ending) and at number 9 on 2 February 2013 (week ending).
 Red re-entered the top 10 at number 8 on 19 January 2013 (week ending) and at number 7 on 2 March 2013 (week ending).
 Babel re-entered the top 10 at number 5 on 23 February 2013 (week ending) for 5 weeks and at number-one on 13 July 2013 (week ending) for 4 weeks.
 Every Kingdom originally peaked at number 7 upon release in 2011, re-peaking at number 6 in 2012. It re-entered the top 10 at number 4 on 2 March 2013 (week ending) for 2 weeks, reaching a new peak.
 Bad Blood re-entered the top 10 at number 10 on 18 May 2013 (week ending), at number 6 on 8 June 2013 (week ending) for 2 weeks, at number 9 on 7 September 2013 (week ending), at number 9 on 21 September 2013 (week ending), at number 6 on 11 January 2014 (week ending) for 5 weeks and at number 10 on 22 February 2014 (week ending) for 5 weeks.
 Graffiti on the Train re-entered the top 10 at number 5 on 31 August 2013 (week ending) for 2 weeks.
 The Truth About Love re-entered the top 10 at number 10 on 16 March 2013 (week ending) for 10 weeks.
 Night Visions re-entered the top 10 at number 10 on 10 August 2013 (week ending) for 4 weeks and at number 9 on 15 March 2014 (week ending).
 To Be Loved re-entered the top 10 at number 4 on 6 July 2013 (week ending) for 9 weeks and at number 6 on 21 December 2013 (week ending) for 3 weeks.
 Home re-entered the top 10 at number 9 on 13 July 2013 (week ending) for 2 weeks, at number 9 on 3 August 2013 (week ending) for 6 weeks, at number 7 on 11 January 2014 (week ending) for 3 weeks and at number 5 on 1 March 2014 (week ending) for 2 weeks.
 All the Little Lights re-entered the top 10 at number 9 on 14 September 2013 (week ending) for 2 weeks and at number 9 on 26 October 2013 (week ending) for 2 weeks.
 The Shocking Miss Emerald re-entered the top 10 at number 10 on 15 June 2013 (week ending).
 Time re-entered the top 10 at number 6 on 21 September 2013 (week ending) for 3 weeks.
 A re-entered the top 10 at number 6 on 22 June 2013 (week ending). 
 Random Access Memories re-entered the top 10 at number 10 on 20 July 2013 (week ending).
 Halcyon re-entered the top 10 at number 10 on 9 February 2013 (week ending), at number 9 on 8 June 2013 (week ending), at number 3 on 7 September 2013 (week ending) for 2 weeks, at number 6 on 28 December 2013 (week ending) for 13 weeks, at number 10 on 26 July 2014 (week ending) for 2 weeks and at number 7 on 16 August 2014 (week ending).
 Settle re-entered the top 10 at number 3 on 1 March 2014 (week ending) for 3 weeks.
 The Complete Greatest Hits originally peaked outside the top 10 at number 27 upon its initial release in 2003. It reached the top 10 for the first time in 2006, peaking number 9 and made number 9 again in 2013.
 In a Perfect World re-entered the top 10 at number 10 on 24 August 2013 (week ending) for 2 weeks.
 Long Way Down re-entered the top 10 at number 10 on 21 September 2013 (week ending).
 AM re-entered the top 10 at number 8 on 11 January 2014 (week ending) for 2 weeks, at number 2 on 1 March 2014 (week ending) for 4 weeks and at number 8 on 31 May 2014 (week ending) for 2 weeks.
 If You Wait re-entered the top 10 at number 9 on 2 November 2013 (week ending) for 2 weeks, at number 10 on 18 January 2014 (week ending) for 2 weeks, at number 7 on 8 February 2014 (week ending) for 8 weeks, at number 9 on 19 April 2014 (week ending) and at number 10 on 7 June 2014 (week ending).
 True re-entered the top 10 at number 9 on 11 January 2014 (week ending) for 7 weeks and at number 4 on 15 March 2014 (week ending).
 Tribute re-entered the top 10 at number 5 on 11 January 2014 (week ending) for 3 weeks and at number 10 on 1 March 2014 (week ending).
 Prism re-entered the top 10 at number 7 on 15 March 2014 (week ending).
 Moon Landing re-entered the top 10 at number 8 on 1 February 2014 (week ending) and at number 6 on 22 February 2014 (week ending).
 Pure Heroine re-entered the top 10 at number 8 on 8 February 2014 (week ending) for 2 weeks, at number 9 on 1 March 2014 (week ending) for 2 weeks and at number 8 on 22 February 2014 (week ending).
 The Marshall Mathers LP 2 re-entered the top 10 at number 7 on 4 January 2014 (week ending) and at number 10 on 8 February 2014 (week ending).
 Music of the Night re-entered the top 10 at number 7 on 30 November 2013 (week ending) for 2 weeks.
 Direct Hits re-entered the top 10 at number 10 on 28 December 2013 (week ending) for 2 weeks.
 Since I Saw You Last re-entered the top 10 at number 9 on 22 February 2014 (week ending), at number 10 on 5 April 2014 (week ending) and at number 2 on 17 May 2014 (week ending) for 2 weeks.
 Figure includes album that peaked in 2012.

See also
2013 in British music
List of number-one albums from the 2000s (UK)

References
General

Specific

External links
2013 album chart archive at the Official Charts Company (click on relevant week)

United Kingdom top 10 albums
Top 10 albums
2013